Joseph Sadi-Lecointe (1891 – 1944) was a French aviator, best known for breaking a number of speed and altitude records in the 1920s.

Biography
Sadi-Lecointe was born on 11 July 1891 at Saint-Germain-sur-Bresle.  He learned to fly at the Zenith school at Issy-les-Moulineaux in 1910 and was awarded French Aero Club license No. 431 on 3 May 1911.  Before formally qualifying, he had taken Georges Clemenceau for a short flight.

During the First World War he saw active service with Escadrille BL.10 and later, flying Nieuport scouts, with Escadrille MS.48. He became a flying instructor in 1916 and in September 1917 he became a test pilot with Bleriot-SPAD, working on the development of the SPAD XIII.

After the war he became a test pilot for Nieuport-Delage, flying their aircraft in a number of races and also using them to set seven speed and three altitude records. He was the winner of the 1920 Gordon Bennett race, securing permanent possession of the trophy for the Aero Club de France and was to fly the French entry for the 1921 Schneider Trophy at Venice, but had to withdraw after an accident during practice.

Between 1925 and 1927 he returned to military service as a volunteer, taking part in the Rif War in Morocco, afterwards returning to his job as chief test pilot with Nieuport Delage.

In 1936 he was appointed Inspector General of Aviation by the French Air Ministry. Mobilised at the outbreak of the Second World War, he became the Inspector of Flying Schools. His political sympathies did not allow him to serve under the Vichy government after the fall of France in 1940, and instead he was active in the French Resistance. On 21 March 1944 he was arrested by the Gestapo and held in Fresnes prison. Released after two months, he died on 15 July 1944 as a result of being tortured while in prison.

Records
Speed
7 February 1920 — Speed over 1 km —  —  Nieuport-Delage NiD 29V
25 September 1920 — Speed over 100 km —  — Nieuport-Delage NiD 29
28 September 1920 — Speed over 200 km —  — Nieuport-Delage NiD 29
10 October 1920 — Speed over 1 km —  — Nieuport-Delage NiD 29V Bis   
20 October 1920 — Speed over 1 km —  — Nieuport-Delage NiD 29V Bis
15 February 1923 — Speed over 1 km —  — Nieuport-Delage NiD 42S 
23 June 1924 — Speed over a distance of  —  — Nieuport-Delage NiD 42
 
Altitude
5 September 1923 —  — Nieuport-Delage NiD 40R 
30 October 1923 —   — Nieuport-Delage NiD 40R    
11 March  1924 —    Nieuport-Delage NiD 40RH (altitude record for floatplanes)

Honours
Commandeur de la Légion d’Honneur
Croix de Guerre 1914-1918
Croix de guerre des théâtres d'opérations extérieures
Croix de Guerre 1939-1945
Médaille de la Résistance
Grande Médaille d’Or de l’Aéro-Club de France
 
There is a street in the XIXieme arrondissement of Paris named in his honour.

Notes

References
Villard, Henry S The Blue Riband of the Air. Washington D.C.:Smithsonian Institution Press, 1987. 

1891 births
1944 deaths
Commandeurs of the Légion d'honneur
Flight altitude record holders
French aviation record holders